Hodge Beck is a stream that flows through the North York Moors national park in North Yorkshire, England. It is a tributary of the River Dove which it joins near Welburn south of Kirkbymoorside.

Course
The beck rises on the flanks of Round Hill in the Cleveland Hills of the North York Moors and flows south through Bransdale to reach Cockayne where it is joined by Bloworth Slack. It continues south to meet Ouse Gill, another tributary before it flows through Sleightholme Dale and Kirkdale where it is forded by a minor road.
The beck often runs dry at this point as it disappears into the local limestone bedrock in the summer months. Near the Kirkdale ford, is Kirkdale Cave, where the fossilised remains of Pleistocene megafauna were found.
On leaving Kirkdale, it is bridged by the A170, and the original A road crossing at Tilehouse Bridge, near Welburn, where it passes Welburn Hall. It continues past Slingsby Aviation airstrip before reaching the River Dove.

Hydrology
The flow of the beck has been measured in its upper and middle reaches since 1936. The upper gauge at Bransdale recorded an average flow of  but was closed in the 1970s. The beck has a natural flow regime, unaffected by direct artificial influences.

Land use within the basin is mainly moorland and grassland with some woodland.

See also
List of rivers of England

References

External links

Hodge Beck water levels at Cherry Farm

Rivers of North Yorkshire